SS Sea Bass may refer to one of two Type C3-S-A2 ships built for the United States Maritime Commission by Western Pipe and Steel:

  (MC hull number 268), delivered on 31 March 1943; sold 1946; scrapped in 1973
  (MC hull number 275), acquired by the United States Navy and converted to  USS Bayfield (AP-78/APA-33); scrapped in 1969

See also
 Sea Bass, a ship operated by The Port Service, Yokohama, Japan

Ship names